Korey Kot is a village of Pakistan in district Sargodha near Tehsil Kot Momin. Its population is about ten thousand. Korey and Koot were two ancient tribes who lived in this village centuries ago. Legend has it that the village was inundated by river Chenab as it used to flow by the village then. The ancestors of village came from village naseerpur a settlement existing since 1150 AD. . 

Ranjha رانجھا, Tarars, Dahar ڈار, Haral, and Gondal are the main tribes but Ranjha is the dominant and most numerous landowning tribe in the village. Village has a number of educated people who are serving the nation as Army Officers, Teachers, Lawyers, Bureaucrats and progressive farmers etc.The village has seen massive transformation mostly in agriculture and infrastructural projects and is now considered one of best developed villages served with five roads, rural hospital, boys high school, girls middle school. Korey Kot has fertile land and is well known for its Kinno (a type of orange) production. Majority of the population belongs to Sunni Muslim sect. Though this village has a large number of educated people yet they are still engaged in medieval-era-like turf wars but situation is improving on fast rate due to heavy investment by people in education of their children . Demographically, the village comprises three major social classes, i.e. landowning class, landless peasants and Kamwalas ---- those who do minor jobs. In fact, this village is a microcosm of the wider class based Pakistani culture. Moreover, shrine of Baba Shah Manzoor, a famous mystic who is said to have gone under the earth alive along with a female follower, is also located in this village. Shah Muhammad Muslim Sheikh, a famous folk singer, was also born in this village.  Numberdars, Sukhe Ke, Ghulam Ke, Salihon Ke and Amirke are respected families, as well more land-owing ones. Until recently this Punjabi waar used to be sung in local gatherings but due to busy pace of life nobody finds time to organise  such events any longer. Apart from this, the village is just five Kilometers away from Takht Hazara, a village, where "Dheedhu Ranjha" the most famous character of  "Heer Ranjha" story was born. Likewise, Bhehra, the first line of defence of Mughal and Sultanate dynasties of India against foreign invaders such as Greek and Persians, is also a few kilometres away from the village. So, "Alexander the Great" and Nadir Shah of Iran must have passed by the village when they invaded India but no claim to the resistance of locals to foreign invaders can be made due to unavailability of historical record. 
Note to the upcoming editors:
(The so called editor if has courage must give true identity don’t use Einstein type gimmicks and then it will be seen who has the problem with first edition). It’s a known fact that village was established by ch Dhan Muhammad and the honour of developing it also lies with his great grandchildren. Allah rewards with honour only those whom he wants ,burning while sitting and doing nothing for people is job of inglorious blood. The true sons of village r known to everyone and with Allah’ s blessings every day brings them with more honourable happenings.

Populated places in Sargodha District